Greg Richards may refer to:

 Greg Richards (decathlete) (born 1956), English decathlete
 Greg Richards (rugby league) (born 1995), English rugby league footballer